The mbozi suckermouth (Chiloglanis mbozi) is a species of upside-down catfish endemic to Tanzania where it occurs in the Lake Rukwa drainage.  This species grows to a length of  TL.

References

External links 

mbozi suckermouth
Fish of Lake Rukwa
Endemic freshwater fish of Tanzania
mbozi suckermouth
mbozi suckermouth
Taxonomy articles created by Polbot